Cauã Paixão de Souza (born 27 May 2004), known as Paixão or Cauã Paixão, is a Brazilian footballer who plays as a forward for Vasco da Gama.

Club career
Paixão joined the academy of Vasco da Gama in 2018, going on to sign his first professional contract in 2021. He made his professional debut in the 2023 season, getting an assist for Matías Galarza in a 1–1 Campeonato Carioca draw with Audax Rio in his second appearance.

Career statistics

Club

References

2004 births
Living people
Sportspeople from Rio de Janeiro (state)
Brazilian footballers
Association football forwards
CR Vasco da Gama players